Rodgersia aesculifolia is a species of flowering plant in the family Saxifragaceae, native to northern China. The leaves resemble those of the horse chestnut, hence the specific epithet aesculifolia (chestnut-leaved).

This plant has gained the Royal Horticultural Society's Award of Garden Merit.

References

Saxifragaceae